The Lazarus Component Library, abbreviated LCL is a visual software component library for the Lazarus IDE.

Description 
The LCL consists of a collection of units that provide components and classes especially for visual tasks. It is based on the Free Pascal libraries RTL and FCL. By binding platform-specific widgetsets it supports platform-sensitive software development for several operating systems including Android, Desktop Linux, Mac OS X and Windows. Lazarus source code files is under a mix of licenses: GNU General Public License, version 2 (GPLv2), a modified LGPL, and the MPL.

It was reported on the GitHub Lazarus repository on 26 August 2013 (latest information ) that the LCL supported Linux (gtk, gtk2 and qt4), all flavors of Windows including WinCE, Mac OS X (carbon, gtk, qt4), and FreeBSD (gtk, gtk2), with experimental support for Solaris and the native Pascal backend fpgui which runs on Windows, WinCE and Linux.

See also 
 Widgetset

Further reading

References

External links 
 LCL documentation in the Free Pascal Wiki
 Complete online reference

Free Pascal
Pascal (programming language) libraries
Computer libraries
Component-based software engineering
Platform-sensitive development